Gideon Sagi (born 17 August 1939) is an Israeli former politician who served as a member of the Knesset for the Labor Party between 1992 and 1996.

Biography
Born in Petah Tikva during the Mandate period, Sagi received a BA from the Hebrew University of Jerusalem, and worked in administration. He was a member of the Histadrut trade union's central committee, and headed the Workers Organisations and Manpower and Administrations departments.

A member of the Labor Party central committee, he was elected to the Knesset on the party's list in 1992. He was a member of several committees, and chaired the Subcommittee for Insurance, before losing his seat in the 1996 elections.

References

External links

1939 births
People from Petah Tikva
Israeli trade unionists
Living people
Israeli Labor Party politicians
Jews in Mandatory Palestine
Members of the 13th Knesset (1992–1996)
Hebrew University of Jerusalem alumni